Bertrand "Bénigne" de Bacilly (Normandy c. 1625 - Paris, 27 September 1690), was a French composer and music theorist, a reformer of the air de cour according to the theories of Pierre de Nyert.

Works, editions and recordings
 Collection Les Airs Spirituels editions published in 1672 and 1677, 1668
 Text Remarques curieuses sur l'art de bien chanter 1688
Recordings
 Bertrand de Bacilly ou l'art d'orner le "beau chant" Ensemble A deux voiles esgales. Saphir 2011
 De Bacilly - Claudine Ansermet, Paolo Cherici. Symphonia 2006
 Airs de Cour - René Jacobs. Harmonia Mundi 1999

See also
 Henry Le Bailly

References

1630s births
1678 deaths
French Baroque composers
French male composers
French music theorists
Musicians from Paris
French male non-fiction writers
17th-century classical composers
17th-century male musicians